In number theory, Dirichlet's theorem, also called the Dirichlet prime number theorem, states that for any two positive coprime integers a and d, there are infinitely many primes of the form a + nd, where n is also a positive integer. In other words, there are infinitely many primes that are congruent to a modulo d. The numbers of the form a + nd form an arithmetic progression

and Dirichlet's theorem states that this sequence contains infinitely many prime numbers. The theorem, named after Peter Gustav Lejeune Dirichlet, extends Euclid's theorem that there are infinitely many prime numbers.  Stronger forms of Dirichlet's theorem state that for any such arithmetic progression, the sum of the reciprocals of the prime numbers in the progression diverges and that different such arithmetic progressions with the same modulus have approximately the same proportions of primes. Equivalently, the primes are evenly distributed (asymptotically) among the congruence classes modulo d containing a'''s coprime to d.

Examples
The primes of the form 4n + 3 are 
 3, 7, 11, 19, 23, 31, 43, 47, 59, 67, 71, 79, 83, 103, 107, 127, 131, 139, 151, 163, 167, 179, 191, 199, 211, 223, 227, 239, 251, 263, 271, 283, ... 
They correspond to the following values of n: 
 0, 1, 2, 4, 5, 7, 10, 11, 14, 16, 17, 19, 20, 25, 26, 31, 32, 34, 37, 40, 41, 44, 47, 49, 52, 55, 56, 59, 62, 65, 67, 70, 76, 77, 82, 86, 89, 91, 94, 95, ...
The strong form of Dirichlet's theorem implies that

is a divergent series.

Sequences dn + a with odd d are often ignored because half the numbers are even and the other half is the same numbers as a sequence with 2d, if we start with n = 0. For example, 6n + 1 produces the same primes as 3n + 1, while 6n + 5 produces the same as 3n + 2 except for the only even prime 2. The following table lists several arithmetic progressions with infinitely many primes and the first few ones in each of them.

Distribution

Since the primes thin out, on average, in accordance with the prime number theorem, the same must be true for the primes in arithmetic progressions. It is natural to ask about the way the primes are shared between the various arithmetic progressions for a given value of d (there are d of those, essentially, if we do not distinguish two progressions sharing almost all their terms). The answer is given in this form: the number of feasible progressions modulo d — those where a and d do not have a common factor > 1 — is given by Euler's totient function

Further, the proportion of primes in each of those is

For example, if d is a prime number q, each of the q − 1 progressions

(all except )

contains a proportion 1/(q − 1) of the primes.

When compared to each other, progressions with a quadratic nonresidue remainder have typically slightly more elements than those with a quadratic residue remainder (Chebyshev's bias).

History

In 1737, Euler related the study of prime numbers to what is known now as the Riemann zeta function: he showed that the value  reduces to a ratio of two infinite products, Π p / Π (p–1), for all primes p, and that the ratio is infinite.Sandifer, C. Edward, The Early Mathematics of Leonhard Euler (Washington, D.C.: The Mathematical Association of America, 2007), p. 253. In 1775, Euler stated the theorem for the cases of a + nd, where a = 1. 
This special case of Dirichlet's theorem can be proven using cyclotomic polynomials.
The proof is modeled on Euler's earlier work relating the Riemann zeta function to the distribution of primes. The theorem represents the beginning of rigorous analytic number theory.

 gave an elementary proof.

Proof
Dirichlet's theorem is proved by showing that the value of the Dirichlet L-function (of a non-trivial character) at 1 is nonzero. The proof of this statement requires some calculus and analytic number theory . The particular case a = 1 (i.e., concerning the primes that are congruent to 1 modulo some n) can be proven by analyzing the splitting behavior of primes in cyclotomic extensions, without making use of calculus .

Generalizations

The Bunyakovsky conjecture generalizes Dirichlet's theorem to higher-degree polynomials.

The Dickson's conjecture generalizes Dirichlet's theorem to more than one polynomial.

The Schinzel's hypothesis H generalizes these two conjectures, i.e. generalizes to more than one polynomial with degree larger than one.

In algebraic number theory, Dirichlet's theorem generalizes to Chebotarev's density theorem.

Linnik's theorem (1944) concerns the size of the smallest prime in a given arithmetic progression. Linnik proved that the progression a + nd (as n ranges through the positive integers) contains a prime of magnitude at most cdL for absolute constants c and L. Subsequent researchers have reduced L to 5.

An analogue of Dirichlet's theorem holds in the framework of dynamical systems (T. Sunada and A. Katsuda, 1990).

Shiu showed that any arithmetic progression satisfying the hypothesis of Dirichlet's theorem will in fact contain arbitrarily long runs of consecutive'' prime numbers.

See also
Bombieri–Vinogradov theorem
Brun–Titchmarsh theorem
Siegel–Walfisz theorem
Dirichlet's approximation theorem
Green–Tao theorem

Notes

References

Chris Caldwell, "Dirichlet's Theorem on Primes in Arithmetic Progressions" at the Prime Pages.
 
.
.
.
.

External links
 Scans of the original paper in German
 Dirichlet: There are infinitely many prime numbers in all arithmetic progressions with first term and difference coprime English translation of the original paper at the arXiv
 Dirichlet's Theorem by Jay Warendorff, Wolfram Demonstrations Project.

Theorems about prime numbers
Zeta and L-functions